Križaj is a surname. Notable people with the surname include:

 Bojan Križaj (born 1957), Slovenian and Yugoslavian alpine skier
 Domen Križaj (born 1989), Slovenian baritone
 Josip Križaj (disambiguation), multiple people
 Andrej Križaj (born 1986), Slovenian alpine skier

Slovene-language surnames